The Third Industrial Revolution; How Lateral Power is Transforming Energy, the Economy, and the World is a book by Jeremy Rifkin published in 2011. The premise of the book is that fundamental economic change occurs when new communication technologies converge with new energy regimes, mainly, renewable electricity.

The sharing economy is also explored as a crucial element of the Third Industrial Revolution.

Reception
Rifkin has been interviewed on NPR.

Documentary 
In 2017 a documentary based on the book was released by Vice Media starring Jeremy Rifkin.

See also 
 Lateral thinking
 100% renewable energy
 Digital revolution
 Sharing economy
 Other books by Jeremy Rifkin:
 The End of Work (1995)
 The European Dream (2004)
 The Empathic Civilization (2010)

References

External links 
 
The Economist: The Third Industrial Revolution - The digitisation of manufacturing will transform the way goods are made, and change the politics of jobs

Books about the Digital Revolution
2011 non-fiction books
Books about energy issues
Renewable energy
Palgrave Macmillan books